Mer Group Ltd.  is an Israeli holding company comprising 3 autonomous business divisions, each headed by a company with subsidiaries, manufacturing facilities and logistics chains.

History
The company’s share are traded on the Tel Aviv Stock Exchange. Mer Group has more than 30 subsidiaries. The company provides products for cellular networks (including telecom towers design and manufacture, civil engineering and telecom implementation services), large scale security projects and broadband network technology.

On 12 February 2020, the United Nations published a database of companies doing business related in the West Bank, including East Jerusalem, as well as in the occupied Golan Heights. Mer Group was listed on the database on account of its activities in Israeli settlements in these occupied territories, which are considered illegal under international law.

See also
List of companies operating in West Bank settlements
Economy of Israel

References

Further reading
Mer Group of Israel looks for partners in India
Company profile on Israel Association of Electronic & Software Industries
MER Group Presents: Safe City in Buenos Aires

External links
 Mer Group
 Mer Group in the Israeli Industry Center for R&D
 Mer Telecom
 Mer Systems
 TechMer
 Athena
 Rotal

Holding companies of Israel